The 1941–42 Gauliga Bayern was the ninth season of the league, one of the 25 Gauligas in Germany at the time. It was the first tier of the football league system in  Bavaria (German:Bayern) from 1933 to 1945. It was the last season of the league played in the single division format with the Gauliga Bayern being sub-divided into north and south in the following edition.

For 1. FC Schweinfurt 05 it was the second of two Gauliga championships the club would win in the era from 1933 to 1944. The club qualified for the 1942 German football championship, where it was knocked out in the intermediate stage after losing 2–1 to SG SS Strassburg.

The eighth edition of the Tschammerpokal, now the DFB-Pokal, was won by Gauliga Bayern club TSV 1860 München who defeated German champions FC Schalke 04 2–0 in the final.

Table
The 1941–42 season saw two new clubs in the league, FC Eintracht/Franken Nürnberg and Reichsbahn SG Weiden.

References

Sources

External links
 Das Deutsche Fussball Archiv  Historic German league tables

1941-42
1